Events in the year 1968 in Turkey.

Parliament
 13th Parliament of Turkey

Incumbents
President – Cevdet Sunay
Prime Minister – Süleyman Demirel 
Leader of the opposition – İsmet İnönü

Ruling party and the main opposition
  Ruling party – Justice Party (AP) 
  Main opposition –  Republican People's Party (CHP)

Cabinet
30th government of Turkey

Events
15 January – Gulf of İzmit froze 
8 March – 22 passengers died in a bus accident near Bolvadin
17 March – 33 passengers died in a bus accident near Istanbul
26 May – Fenerbahçe is the champion of the Turkish football league
2 June – Senate 1/3 elections (AP 38 seats, CHP 13 seats, MP 1 seat, GP 1 seat) 
3 September – The Bartın earthquake affected the area with a maximum Mercalli intensity of VIII (Severe), causing 24–29 deaths and 200 injuries
17 June and the following days – Widespread university demonstrations 
25–30 October – French President Charles de Gaulle visits Turkey.
22 November – First heart transplantations in Turkey (Ankara)
31 December – TRT 1 First television broadcast

Births
23 February – İlhan Cihaner, politician and lawyer
1 July – Emine Ayna, politician
5 June – Şebnem Dönmez, actress
17 July – Derya Arbaş Berti (Derya Arbaş), actress
11 August – Özlem Çerçioğlu, mayor of Aydın
30 October – Merve Kavakçı, politician
3 December – Aylin Nazlıaka, politician

Deaths
10 January – Ali Fuat Cebesoy (born 1882), former general
9 March – Haşim İşcan (born 1898), mayor of Istanbul
2 September – Sabiha Sertel, female journalist
11 October – Selim Sarper (born 1899) former minister of foreign affairs

Gallery

See also
 1967–68 1.Lig
Turkey at the 1968 Summer Olympics
Turkey at the 1968 Winter Olympics

References

 
Years of the 20th century in Turkey
Turkey
Turkey
[[Category:1968 by country|Turkey]|]